Erin Louise Vaughan (born 15 February 1986) is a Welsh football coach and former player. She was a defender for Aston Villa and the Wales women's national football team. She is the daughter of former Wales international footballer Nigel Vaughan. She now is a coach at ISC Gunners FC.

Club career
Vaughan helped Shrewsbury Town win the Shropshire County Cup in 2005.

She then joined Aston Villa Ladies for season 2005–06. During the 2012 off-season, Vaughan played in the American Women's Premier Soccer League (WPSL) for Issaquah SC.

When Aston Villa successfully bid for inclusion in the new FA WSL 2 in 2014, Vaughan remained an important part of the team.

International career
Vaughan represented Wales at U19 level, winning five caps. Her full debut was on 15 March 2006, in a 3–2 friendly defeat in Switzerland.

References

External links
UEFA bio of Erin Vaughan

Living people
1986 births
Footballers from Newport, Wales
Welsh women's footballers
Wales women's international footballers
Aston Villa W.F.C. players
Women's association football defenders
FA Women's National League players
Women's Championship (England) players
Women's Premier Soccer League players
Expatriate women's soccer players in the United States
Welsh expatriate sportspeople in the United States